Karra is both a given name and a surname. It is also considered to be a variant of Cara. Notable people with the name include:

Given name
Karra Elejalde (born 1960), Spanish actor
Karra Subba Reddy (died 2004), Indian politician

Surname
George Karra (born 1952), Israeli Arab jurist
Irini Karra (born 1986), Greek mode
Tariq Hameed Karra (born 1955), Indian politician

See also

Kalra (surname)
Kamra (surname)
Kara (name)
Kaira (disambiguation)
Karla (name)
Karma (disambiguation)
Karna (disambiguation)
Karpa (surname)
Karr (surname)
Karra (disambiguation)
Karrar (name)
Karre
Karri (name)
Karta (disambiguation)
Kasra (disambiguation)
Korra (disambiguation)